is a former Japanese football player and manager.

Playing career
Uki was born in Matsudo on October 4, 1971. After graduating from Tokyo Gakugei University, he joined Japan Football League club Tokyo Gas in 1994. He became a regular player as center back from first season. In 1997, he moved to J1 League club JEF United Ichihara. However he could hardly play in the match. In 1998, he returned to Tokyo Gas and the club won the champions in 1998 season. In 1999, he moved to newly was promoted to J2 League club, Omiya Ardija. Although he played as center back until July 1999, he was converted to defensive midfielder in August. In 2001, he moved to J2 club Montedio Yamagata. He played as regular defensive midfielder. In 2002, he moved to J2 club Oita Trinita. He played as regular defensive midfielder and the club won the champions in 2002 and was promoted to J1 from 2003. However he could hardly play in the match in 2003. In 2004, he moved to J2 club Shonan Bellmare. He played many matches as defensive midfielder and center back. In August 2005, he moved to J2 club Yokohama FC and played many matches as center back. In 2006, he moved to Japan Football League club FC Kariya. Although he played many matches as regular player, the club results were bad and manager Nariyasu Yasuhara was sacked in July 2007. Uki retired and became a new manager as Yasuhara successor.

Coaching career
In July 2007, Uki retired from playing career at Japan Football League club FC Kariya and became a manager. Although the club results were bad and finished 16th place in 2007, the club finished at 8th place in 2008. However the club finished at 17th place in 2009 and was relegated to Regional Leagues end of 2009 season. He also resigned end of 2009 season. In 2010, he moved to FC Gifu and became a coach for top team. In 2016, he moved to Shonan Bellmare. He coached for top team and youth team until 2016. In 2017, he moved to J3 League club Kataller Toyama. Although the club finished at 8th place in 2017, the club results were bad in 2018 and he was sacked in May when the club was at bottom place of 17 clubs.

Club statistics

Managerial statistics

References

External links
 
 

1971 births
Living people
Tokyo Gakugei University alumni
Association football people from Chiba Prefecture
Japanese footballers
J1 League players
J2 League players
Japan Football League (1992–1998) players
Japan Football League players
FC Tokyo players
JEF United Chiba players
Omiya Ardija players
Montedio Yamagata players
Oita Trinita players
Shonan Bellmare players
Yokohama FC players
FC Kariya players
Japanese football managers
J3 League managers
Kataller Toyama managers
Association football midfielders